Blue star or bluestar may refer to:

 O-type star (a.k.a. blue star), a stellar classification

Animals
 Linckia laevigata, a sea star from the Indian and West Pacific Oceans
 Phataria unifascialis, a sea star from the East Pacific

Businesses
 Blue Star (company), an Indian Air conditioning company
 Blue Star Ferries, a Greek ferry company
 Blue Star Infotech, Indian company
 Blue Star Line, a former British shipping company
 Blue Star Productions, a publishing imprint and a division of Book World, Inc
 Bluestar (bus company), based in Southampton, England
 Bluestar Company, a predecessor of ChemChina

Military
 Operation Blue Star, a 1984 Indian military operation
 Blue stars used on service flags denote a United States service member fighting in a war
 Blue Star Memorial Highway, a system of highway markers honoring veterans
 Blue Star Mothers Club, a non-profit military support group

Music
 "Blue Star" (song), first recorded 1955
 Blue Star (album), is an album by Levinhurst

Plants
 Amsonia, plant species also named "bluestar"
 Hubricht's Bluestar (Amsonia hubrichtii), plant
 Isotoma axillaris

Others
 The Blue Star (novel), a 1952 fantasy novel by Fletcher Pratt
 Newcastle Blue Star F.C., English association football team
 Blue star, the logo of Newcastle Brown Ale
 BlueStar PR, Jewish political organization
 Tesla BlueStar, code name for the Tesla Model 3 electric car
 Blue Star Wicca, a sect of traditionalist witches
 Blue Star, a nickname for the United States business band frequency of 467.925 MHz
 Blue Star (SLV), satellite launcher
 Blue star tattoo legend
 Blue Star, a type of Multiple working system used on British locomotives
 Blue Star Kachina, a legendary spirit

See also
Blue Stars (disambiguation)
 Blue (disambiguation)
 Star (disambiguation)
 Blue giant (disambiguation)
 Blue dwarf (disambiguation)
 Blue Planet (disambiguation)
 Blue world (disambiguation)